Sams is an unincorporated community in San Miguel County, in the U.S. state of Colorado.

History
A post office called Sams was in operation between 1903 and 1950. Sams was named after the proprietor of a local sawmill.

References

Unincorporated communities in San Miguel County, Colorado
Unincorporated communities in Colorado